Renato L. Requiestas (January 22, 1957 – July 24, 1993), professionally known as Rene Requiestas,  was a Filipino actor and comedian. Requiestas was one of the top Filipino comedians of the late 1980s up to the early 1990s. Requiestas was known for his sidekick roles alongside other comedy actors such as Joey de Leon and his pairing with Kris Aquino in romantic comedies, as well as his distinctive gaunt, toothless appearance.

Career
Requiestas' early appearances in films consisted of small incidental roles in dramas such as Ikaw Ay Akin in 1978 and Alyas Batman en Robin 1991 as The Joker,
Pabling in 1981. From 1987 to 1988, he was a cast member of the stage play WIS: Walang Ibig Sabihin at the Manila Metropolitan Theater, with critic Mike Feria noting his inclination to ad-lib. He would later receive supporting roles in comedy films beginning with Sheman: Mistress of the Universe in September 1988. His performance in Smith & Wesson as the bumbling villain named Don Johnson Waks was praised by critic Lav Diaz, who considered him to have a natural talent in comedy.

Maricel Soriano, who collaborated with Requiestas in the film Leon at Tigre, expressed that unlike other lead actors she worked with in comedies, he was usually quiet and by himself on the set. Requiestas once remarked that the films he does is largely for his mother, stating that "She is already old and [I] need to be sure that everything is for her. I don't want her to experience anymore hardships at her age."

In 1992, Requiestas was elected a councilor of Taguig's 2nd (lone) district.

Personal life
In 1989, Requiestas expressed his wish to attend college in order to set an example for his siblings. Later that year, Requiestas adopted a daughter and named her Darren Krisnee, taken from his and Kris Aquino's names. She was born on November 11, 1989 to Requiestas' distant relatives, but due to their difficulty in raising numerous children, Requiestas decided to adopt the child as his own.

Death
Requiestas died on July 24, 1993 at the age of 36 due to tuberculosis and complications brought about by alcohol abuse and smoking.
He was buried in Manila Memorial Park in Parañaque.

Filmography

Film

Television
U.F.O.: Urbano, Felissa & Others (1985–1989)
Sic O'Clock News (1987–1989)
Mother Studio Presents (produced by Regal Television, 1987–1993)
Regal Shockers (1988–1993)
Lovingly Yours, Helen (1988)
Coney Reyes on Camera (1989)
Bhoy (1989–1991)
Sa Linggo nAPO Sila (1990–1993)
GMA Presents: Alice (1990)
Palibhasa Lalake (1990) - Adonis
Pandakekoks (1990–1992)
Maalaala Mo Kaya (1991–1993) - his last TV appearance
Tunay Na Buhay (2013) - aired posthumously 20 years after his death in 1993
Sabado Badoo (2015) - posthumous cameo stock footage

Awards

References

External links

1957 births
1993 deaths
20th-century comedians
20th-century deaths from tuberculosis
20th-century Filipino male actors
Burials at the Manila Memorial Park – Sucat
Filipino male comedians
Male actors from Manila
Metro Manila city and municipal councilors
People from Tondo, Manila
Tuberculosis deaths in the Philippines
People from Taguig
Filipino actor-politicians
Male actors from Metro Manila
Alcohol-related deaths in the Philippines